Monte Forte is a settlement in the Lembá District on the northwestern coast of São Tomé Island in São Tomé and Príncipe. Its population is 87 (2012 census). It lies 1.5 km west of Ponta Figo and 3 km southwest of the district capital Neves.

Population history

References

Populated places in Lembá District